A virgin neutron is a neutron which has originated from any source but has not yet collided with anything.

References 

Neutron